Gunnar Talsethagen (15 March 1931 − 11 December 2021) was a Norwegian author and former football player, football coach and lecturer. As an active player, Talsethagen spent most of his entire career at Molde FK. He grew up in Molde.

Coaching career
Gunnar Talsethagen had three spells as head coach at Molde FK between 1956 and 1968. His first season as coach, he was still playing and shared the responsibilities with co-head coach Arne Legernes throughout the 1956–57 season. In 1959, he began his second spell as Molde's head coach. He was replaced by Ulf Møller in 1962, but was back as head coach in 1963. Molde, a third tier club at the time, were led by Talsethagen until the end of the 1968 season. During his third and final spell as Molde's head coach, Talsethagen managed the team in a total of 102 matches and won 59 of them.

Career as writer
In 2000, Talsethagen's book Gatelangs i Molde was published. The book contains stories about streets and roads in the municipality of Molde.

Managerial statistics

References

1931 births
2021 deaths
People from Molde
Norwegian footballers
Norwegian writers
Molde FK players
Molde FK managers
Norwegian football managers
Association footballers not categorized by position